One in a Million is the second album by Bosson, the album was released on August 25, 2002.

Singles
The first single, "One in a Million", which can also be found in the Miss Congeniality soundtrack, was nominated for a Best Original Song – Motion Picture at the 58th Golden Globe Awards.

The second single, "I Believe" also released and receive warm success.

Track listing

Chart performance

References

2002 albums
Bosson albums